Ruddle Road Halt railway station was a minor station on the Gloucester-Newport Railway on the outskirts of Newnham, Gloucestershire. It was also the start of a branch line to Cinderford New station and Mitcheldean Road station on the Hereford, Ross and Gloucester Railway. It closed in 1917 and has since been demolished. The track remains in use on the Gloucester to Newport line. The branch to Cinderford closed in 1967 and has since been returned to agriculture and built on.

Services

References

External links
Ruddle Road Halt
Ruddle Road & Bullo Cross Halts
The Main Line - Severn Tunnel Junction to Gloucester

Disused railway stations in Gloucestershire
Former Great Western Railway stations
Railway stations opened in 1907
Railway stations closed in 1917